The 1961 Baylor Bears football team represented Baylor University during the 1961 NCAA University Division football season. The Bears were led by third-year head coach John Bridgers and played their home games at Baylor Stadium in Waco, Texas. They competed as members of the Southwest Conference, finishing in sixth with a regular season record of 5–5 (2–5 SWC). Baylor was invited to the first Gotham Bowl, where they beat the previously-undefeated Utah State Aggies, 24–9.

Schedule

References

Baylor
Baylor Bears football seasons
Baylor Bears football